VPR Mining Infra Private Ltd., is a diversified Mining Company with its Head Office in Hyderabad, India. As in March 2016 the company has executed 360 Million Bank Cubic Meter (BCM) of excavations  of all kinds.

Overview 
The company was registered as Private Limited company in the year 2008. Founded and Promoted by Vemireddy Prabhakar Reddy, The company undertakes works pan-India.

The company has worked on many government projects in Central Coalfields, Northern Coalfields, Western Coalfields, Mahanadi Coalfields, National Mineral Development Corporation, NTPC Limited and Singareni Collieries Company.

The company also does many Irrigation projects that Involve heavy excavations for the government bodies like AP Irrigation and CAD, Telangana Irrigation and CAD, Vidarbha Irrigation and CAD and Waters Resources Department Maharastra.

References 
 Tata Hitachi rolls out 10,000th machine from Kharagpur plant to VPR Mining Infra Private Ltd - Business Standard
 Smarter and Leaner Mining Solutions - Article on Mining Magazine mentioning VPR Mining collaboration.
 Indian miner boosts profitability with Scania’s help - Scania Websites Proud Article on VPR Collaboration.

Companies based in Hyderabad, India
Indian companies established in 2008
2008 establishments in Andhra Pradesh
Mining companies of India